The 1972 All-Atlantic Coast Conference football team consists of American football players chosen by various selectors for their All-Atlantic Coast Conference ("ACC") teams for the 1972 NCAA University Division football season. Selectors in 1972 included the United Press International (UPI).

All-Atlantic Coast Conference selections

Offensive selections

Ends
 Dave Sullivan, Virginia (UPI)
 Pat Kenney, NC State (UPI)

Offensive tackles
 Rick Druschel, NC State (UPI)
 Jerry Sain, North Carolina (UPI)

Offensive guards
 Ron Rusnak, North Carolina (UPI)
 Bill Yoest, NC State (UPI)

Centers
 Dale Grimes, Duke (UPI)

Quarterbacks
 Bruce Shaw, NC State (UPI)

Backs
 Steve Jones, Duke (UPI)
 Stan Fritts, NC State (UPI)
 Willie Burden, NC State (UPI)

Defensive selections

Defensive ends
 Gene Brown, North Carolina (UPI)
 Melvin Parker, Duke (UPI)

Defensive tackles
 Ed Newman, Duke (UPI)
 Eric Hyman, North Carolina (UPI)

Linebackers
 Mike Mansfield, North Carolina (UPI)
 Paul Vellano, Maryland (UPI)
 Jimmy DeRatt, North Carolina (UPI)
 Nick Arcaro, Wake Forest (UPI)

Defensive backs
 Bill Hanenberg, Duke (UPI)
 Lou Angelo, North Carolina (UPI)
 Mike Stultz, NC State (UPI)
 Bob Smith, Maryland (UPI)

Special teams

Kickers
 Chuck Ramsey, Wake Forest (UPI)

Key
UPI = United Press International

See also
1972 College Football All-America Team

References

All-Atlantic Coast Conference football team
All-Atlantic Coast Conference football teams